Choristoneura lafauryana, the strawberry leafroller, is a species of moth of the family Tortricidae. It is found in Spain, Great Britain, the Netherlands, Belgium, France, Germany, Switzerland, Italy, Romania and Russia. In the east, the range extends to China (Heilongjiang, Jilin, Liaoning), Korea and Japan.

The wingspan is 18–21 mm for males and 20–24 mm for females. Adults have been recorded on wing from July to August in western Europe.

The larvae feed on Artemisia (including Artemisia montana), Cirsium, Lespedeza, Ribes, Myrica (including Myrica gale), Forsythia, Larix, Fragaria (including Fragaria x ananassa), Pyrus and Salix species, as well as Rhododendron tomentosa, Glycine max, Medicago sativa, Trifolium repens, Morella rubra, Boehmeria nivea, Malus pumila and Malus sylvestris. They live between leaves and shoots spun together with silk. Larvae have been recorded nearly year-round since the species overwinters as a young larva.

Etymology
The species is named for Dr. Francois Clément Lafaury who first discovered the larvae of this species.

References

Moths described in 1875
Choristoneura